James Worsley  (1725–1787) was a British politician who sat in the House of Commons between 1775 and 1784.

Worsley was the eldest son of David Worsley of Stenbury and his wife Mary Hooke, daughter of William Hooke and was born on 10 April 1725.

Worsley was returned as Member of Parliament for Yarmouth (Isle of Wight) at a by-election on 6 February 1775 presumably on the Holmes interest. He was replacing his second cousin Edward Meux Worsley. In the 1784 general election he was returned as MP for Newtown (Isle of Wight). He may have been brought in by his distant cousin Sir Richard Worsley as a stop-gap since he resigned his seat a few months later in August 1784. It appears that  he never spoke in Parliament.

Worsley died on 10 April 1787

References

1725 births
1787 deaths
British MPs 1774–1780
British MPs 1784–1790
Members of Parliament for the Isle of Wight